John "Jack" Hendry (1867 – 1917) was a Scottish footballer who played in the Football League for Notts County. Jack Hendry was responsible for the handball foul in the February 1891  FA Cup quarter final that is credited for changing opinion in English soccer about the legitimacy of penalty kicks. Hendry had denied Stoke an equaliser With only seconds of the game remaining by handling the ball on the goal-line. The resulting free-kick was lost denying Stoke chance of a place in the semi-final while Notts proceeded as far as the 1891 FA Cup Final.

References

1867 births
1917 deaths
Scottish footballers
Rangers F.C. players
Notts County F.C. players
Northampton Town F.C. players
Heanor Town F.C. players
English Football League players
Footballers from Glasgow
Association football fullbacks
FA Cup Final players